South Hwanghae Province (Hwanghaenamdo; , lit. "south Yellow Sea province") is a province in western North Korea. The province was formed in 1954 when the former Hwanghae Province was split into North and South Hwanghae. The provincial capital is Haeju.

Geography
The province is part of the Haeso region, and is bounded on the west by the Yellow Sea, on the north and east by North Hwanghae province. There are some administrative exclaves of Nampo City in the north of the province. The southern border of the province is marked by the Korean Demilitarized Zone with South Korea. The province draws its name from what were the largest cities in Hwanghae, Haeju and Hwangju; the name, which literally means "Yellow Sea" in Korean, also references the Yellow Sea, which forms the province's western bound.

The coastline of South Hwanghae is dotted by many small islands, many of which are uninhabited. Many of the largest islands, such as Baengnyeong-do are administered by South Korea. The Northern Limit Line, which runs through the region and demarcates a disputed maritime boundary between the north and south, is another frequent subject of contention between the two countries. The largest islands which indisputably belong to North Korea are Kirin-do, Changrin-do, and Sunwi-do.

The province, being not very mountainous, is uniquely suited to farming, and is thus often referred to as the "bread-basket" of North Korea. Much of the land is devoted to farming, and thus was not hit as hard as other parts of the country during the Arduous March of the 1990s. Many types of vegetables, fruits, grains, and rice are grown on the plains of the region; Kwail County, which means fruit in Korean, was founded to grow orchards.

Haeju, the provincial capital, is also the largest port in southern North Korea outside of Wonsan. The area is also home to several ancient burial mounds and cultural relics, such as the Kangsosa Buddhist temple, ancient stone pagodas, and a Koryo-era ice house. There are also many Iron Age dolmen and Koguryo tombs in the province, such as Anak Tomb No. 3.

Administrative divisions

South Hwanghae is divided into 1 city (si) and 19 counties (gun). These are further divided into villages (ri) in rural areas and dong (neighborhoods) in cities, which are detailed on each county's individual page.

Cities

Counties

See also

 Geography of North Korea

References

 https://web.archive.org/web/20110719154907/http://sunsite.berkeley.edu:8085/korea/250k/NJ51_12.jpg
 http://www.cybernk.net/infoText/InfoAdminstList.aspx?mc=AD0101&ac=A05
 http://nk.joins.com/map/view.asp?idx=i103.htm

 
Provinces of North Korea